The 1963–64 Bundesliga season was the inaugural season for a single division highest tier of football in West Germany. It began on 24 August 1963 and ended on 9 May 1964. The first goal was scored by Friedhelm Konietzka for Borussia Dortmund in their game against Werder Bremen. The championship was won by 1. FC Köln. The first teams to be relegated were Preußen Münster and 1. FC Saarbrücken.

Competition modus
Every team played two games against each other team, one at home and one away. Teams received two points for a win and one point for a draw. If two or more teams were tied on points, places were determined by goal average. The team with the most points were crowned champions while the two teams with the fewest points were relegated to their respective Regionalliga divisions.

Teams

Sixteen teams were chosen from all Oberliga teams on both competitive and infrastructural aspects. The West and South divisions supplied five teams each, three clubs came from the North, while the Southwest provided two participants. The final member was chosen from the Oberliga Berlin.

The selection of teams for the inaugural Bundesliga season was controversial. Alemannia Aachen and Kickers Offenbach believed that they should have been chosen, due to their superior record over division rivals over the previous twelve seasons. They were not selected due to their relatively poorer performance in the seasons immediately preceding the start of the Bundesliga.

League table

Results

Top goalscorers
30 goals
  Uwe Seeler (Hamburger SV)

20 goals
  Friedhelm Konietzka (Borussia Dortmund)

19 goals
  Rudolf Brunnenmeier (1860 Munich)

18 goals
  Wilhelm Huberts (Eintracht Frankfurt)
  Klaus Matischak (FC Schalke 04)

16 goals
  Lothar Emmerich (Borussia Dortmund)
  Heinz Strehl (1. FC Nürnberg)
  Karl-Heinz Thielen (1. FC Köln)

15 goals
  Christian Müller (1. FC Köln)
  Dieter Höller (VfB Stuttgart)
  Gert Dörfel (Hamburger SV)

Champion squad

References

External links
DFB archive, 1963–64 season 
Sebastian Stolz. The Bundesliga: a true success story. www.bundesliga.com. 2 June 2009 

Bundesliga seasons
1
Germany